is the 19th single by Japanese singer Yōko Oginome, released on September 27, 1989 by Victor Entertainment. It is a Japanese-language cover of the song of the same title by James Christian, with lyrics by Masao Urino.

Background and release
Prior to Oginome's version, "You're My Life" was first covered by Miyoko Yoshimoto in her 1987 album Yesterday's. Oginome's version peaked at No. 10 on Oricon's singles chart, becoming her last top-10 hit in her career. It also sold over 59,000 copies. The song earned Oginome the Gold Award at the 31st Japan Record Awards, the Best Hit Song Award at the 1989 FNS Music Festival, the Excellence Award at the 15th NTV Music Festival, and the Best Talent Award at the 15th All Japan Kayo Music Festival. Oginome performed the song on the 40th Kōhaku Uta Gassen in 1989, making her third appearance on NHK's New Year's Eve special.

The song was also used as the theme song of the TBS drama special , which also starred Oginome.

Track listing

Charts

References

External links

1989 singles
Yōko Oginome songs
Japanese-language songs
Japanese television drama theme songs
Songs with lyrics by Masao Urino
Victor Entertainment singles